Persatuan Sepakbola Amuntai (simply known as Perseam) is an Indonesian football club based in Amuntai, North Hulu Sungai Regency, South Kalimantan. They currently competes in Liga 3.

References

External links
 

Football clubs in Indonesia
Football clubs in South Kalimantan
Sport in South Kalimantan